The Buffalo Bandits are a lacrosse team based in Buffalo playing in the National Lacrosse League (NLL). The 2005 season was the 14th in franchise history.

The Bandits finished second in the east after stellar seasons from veterans John Tavares and Steve Dietrich, who was named Goaltender of the Year. They hosted the Rochester Knighthawks in the division semi-final game, but the Knighthawks defeated the Bandits 19-14, winning the right to face the eventual champion Toronto Rock in the division finals.

Regular season

Conference standings

Game log
Reference:

Playoffs

Game log
Reference:

Player stats
Reference:

Runners (Top 10)

Note: GP = Games played; G = Goals; A = Assists; Pts = Points; LB = Loose Balls; PIM = Penalty minutes

Goaltenders
Note: GP = Games played; MIN = Minutes; W = Wins; L = Losses; GA = Goals against; Sv% = Save percentage; GAA = Goals against average

Awards

Transactions

Trades

Roster
Reference:

See also
2005 NLL season

References

Buffalo
Buffalo Bandits